South Fermanagh was a UK Parliament constituency in Ireland.

Boundaries and Boundary Changes
This county constituency comprised the southern part of County Fermanagh. The seat was defined under the Redistribution of Seats Act 1885 as comprising the baronies of Clanawley, Clankelly, Coole, Knockninny, and Magherastephana. The seat was unchanged under the Redistribution of Seats (Ireland) Act 1918.

It returned one Member of Parliament 1885–1922.

Prior to the 1885 United Kingdom general election the area was part of the Fermanagh constituency. After the dissolution of Parliament in 1922 the constituency was incorporated in the new seat of Fermanagh and Tyrone

Politics
The constituency was a nationalist inclined one, but with a significant unionist minority. The Irish Parliamentary Party held the seat from 1885 to 1918.

In 1918 Sinn Féin had a limited electoral pact with the Nationalists to avoid seriously splitting the vote in seats Unionists might win. In this constituency Sinn Féin benefited from the pact, as nationalists were advised to vote for John O'Mahoney (otherwise known as Seán O'Mahony) rather than their own candidate (the incumbent MP).

O'Mahony was a prisoner interned in Lincoln Jail at the time of the election. He was the only Sinn Féin candidate elected in the six counties that became Northern Ireland who was not also returned for a seat in the rest of Ireland. After being released in 1919 he did not take his seat in the UK Parliament but served in the First Dáil instead.

The First Dáil
Sinn Féin contested the general election of 1918 on the platform that instead of taking up any seats they won in the United Kingdom Parliament, they would establish a revolutionary assembly in Dublin. In republican theory every MP elected in Ireland was a potential Deputy to this assembly. In practice only the Sinn Féin members accepted the offer.

The revolutionary First Dáil assembled on 21 January 1919 and last met on 10 May 1921. The First Dáil, according to a resolution passed on 10 May 1921, was formally dissolved on the assembling of the Second Dáil. This took place on 16 August 1921.

In 1921 Sinn Féin decided to use the UK authorised elections for the Northern Ireland House of Commons and the House of Commons of Southern Ireland as a poll for the Irish Republic's Second Dáil. This area, in republican theory, was incorporated in an eight-member Dáil constituency of Fermanagh and Tyrone.

Members of Parliament

Elections
The elections in this constituency took place using the first past the post electoral system.

Elections in the 1880s

Elections in the 1890s

Elections in the 1900s

Elections in the 1910s

References

Debrett's Guide to the House of Commons and Judicial Bench, 1918

External links
 https://www.oireachtas.ie/en/members/

See also
 List of UK Parliament Constituencies in Ireland and Northern Ireland
 Redistribution of Seats (Ireland) Act 1918
 List of MPs elected in the 1918 United Kingdom general election
 List of Dáil Éireann constituencies in Ireland (historic)
 Members of the 1st Dáil

South Fermanagh
Dáil constituencies in Northern Ireland (historic)
Constituencies of the Parliament of the United Kingdom established in 1885
Constituencies of the Parliament of the United Kingdom disestablished in 1922